Myron Lowery was the Mayor Pro Tem of Memphis, Tennessee, from July 31, 2009 to October 26, 2009.  He is a former television news anchor for WMC-TV 5 in Memphis. Mayor Pro Tem Lowery has served on the Memphis City Council since 1991. He became interim mayor on July 31, 2009, following the retirement of Mayor W. W. Herenton. He ran for Mayor of Memphis in a special election held on October 15, 2009, losing to A C Wharton.

Lowery's tenure as Mayor Pro Tem was marked by attempts to remove officials from Herenton's controversial prior administration and efforts at transparency in government.

In the past, Lowery has served as a board member of the Tennessee Municipal League, Tennessee Quality, Goals for Memphis, Leadership Memphis, Goodwill Boys Club, The Memphis Zoo, the Headstart Policy Council, and the Board of Trustees of LeMoyne-Owen College.

In the national arena, Lowry is a member of the Board of Directors for National League of Cities. He has served as Vice-President of the National Association of Black Journalists and as Secretary, Treasurer, Vice- Chairman and Chairman of the Democratic Municipal Officials. In 1996, he was a speaker at the Democratic National Convention. Lowery is currently serving his fourth term as a member of the Democratic National Committee and is a member of the National Black Caucus of Local Elected Officials. He was also the former treasurer of the United Negro College Fund's National Alumni Council.

Lowery has a Bachelor of Science in Sociology from LeMoyne-Owen College, a Master of Science in Education from New York University and a Master of Science in Urban Education from the University of Tennessee. He also holds an honorary degree from Southeastern College of Technology.

In September 2009, Lowery greeted visiting Tibetan Buddhist leader, the Dalai Lama, with a fist bump, which garnered brief national news coverage. Lowery reportedly pre-arranged the greeting with the leader's handlers.

In July 2015, Lowery moved to unearth the remains of Civil War general Nathan Bedford Forest and his wife and have his memorial removed because: "It is no longer politically correct to glorify someone who was a slave trader, someone who was a racist, on public property."

References
 Fox News Councilmember takes first step to remove Nathan Bedford Forrest statue from a city park
 Zack McMillin, Myron Lowery takes long path to top job; Council leader to serve as mayor until election, Memphis Commercial Appeal, June 26, 2009
 Myron Lowery files petition to run for Memphis mayor, Memphis Commercial Appeal, August 26, 2009
 Council Super District 8
 Associated Press, Dalai Lama comes to Memphis, gets fist bump, joke, September 23, 2009; retrieved from WISH-TV website on October 27, 2009

African-American people in Tennessee politics
Living people
Mayors of Memphis, Tennessee
LeMoyne–Owen College alumni
Steinhardt School of Culture, Education, and Human Development alumni
University of Tennessee alumni
Politicians from Columbus, Ohio
Tennessee city council members
Tennessee Democrats
Year of birth missing (living people)
African-American mayors in Tennessee
21st-century African-American people